Omidabad or Ommidabad may refer to:
 Omidabad, Chaharmahal and Bakhtiari
 Omidabad, Golestan